Francis Hope Evans (13 May 1902 – 2 October 1991) was an Australian rules footballer who played with Carlton in the Victorian Football League (VFL).

Evans was recruited from Albury Federals Football Club.

Notes

External links 

 
Hope Evans's profile at Blueseum

1902 births
1991 deaths
Carlton Football Club players
Australian rules footballers from New South Wales